Gaute Helstrup (born 15 May 1976) is a retired Norwegian football midfielder and current manager.

He joined Tromsdalen at the age of 15, made his first-team debut at the age of 18 and played there his entire career. The exception was four seasons in the Eliteserien, in Tromsø and Haugesund.

Helstrup served as assistant coach of Tromsdalen in 2005 and 2006, then player developer. From 2009 through 2010 he was again assistant under Morten Pedersen, then manager. After guiding Tromsdalen to a record-high 7th place in the 2018 1. divisjon he was picked up by Hamarkameratene as their new manager. In May 2020 he was bought free from his Hamarkameratene contract and signed by Tromsø IL as manager.

Managerial statistics

References

1976 births
Living people
Sportspeople from Tromsø
Norwegian footballers
Tromsdalen UIL players
Tromsø IL players
FK Haugesund players
Eliteserien players
Norwegian First Division players
Association football midfielders
Norwegian football managers
Hamarkameratene managers
Tromsø IL managers